Laura Barton (born 1977) is an English journalist and writer. She writes mainly for The Guardian, and wrote a novel, Twenty-One Locks, published in 2010.

Biography
Barton was born in and grew up in the village of Newburgh in Lancashire, and was educated at Winstanley College and read for an English degree at Worcester College, Oxford. Following graduation, she began writing for The Guardian from 2000 specialising in writing features. She has also written for Q magazine, The Word, and Intelligent Life, and broadcast on BBC Radio 4. Much of her writing relates to rock and pop music, and until late 2011 she wrote a fortnightly column about music for The Guardians Film and Music supplement, called "Hail, Hail, Rock and Roll", as well as a weekly column on women's issues for the newspaper's G2 supplement, called "The View from a Broad".

Her novel, Twenty-One Locks (2010), recounts the story of "a young small-town girl facing the biggest decision of her life." Barton has said she is working on a second novel and a non-fiction book about music. A series of short stories about Northern soul was broadcast on Radio 4 in 2011. Her favourite writers include Gerard Manley Hopkins, Richard Yates, Bruce Chatwin, William Carlos Williams, e e cummings, Raymond Carver, Lorrie Moore, and Joyce Johnson.

Barton married in 2004. She subsequently divorced.

References

External links
  Laura Barton's staff page at The Guardian
  
 Reviews by Laura Barton at BBC Music

1977 births
Living people
Alumni of Worcester College, Oxford
21st-century English novelists
21st-century English women writers
English columnists
English music journalists
English women journalists
English women novelists
People from the Borough of West Lancashire
The Guardian journalists
British women columnists
Women writers about music
English women non-fiction writers